Clapham may refer to:

Places in Australia 

 Clapham, South Australia, a suburb in Adelaide

Places in England

Clapham, a district in the London Borough of Lambeth
 near to Clapham Junction railway station
 and Clapham Common and Clapham Park
 and was home to the Clapham Sect
 and the former Clapham parliamentary constituency
Clapham, Bedfordshire, a village
Clapham, North Yorkshire, a village
 near to Clapham railway station
Clapham, West Sussex, a village
Clapham, Devon, a village in Devon

People

 Clapham (surname)